The 2020 Famous Idaho Potato Bowl was a college football bowl game played on December 22, 2020, with kickoff at 3:30 p.m. EST (1:30 p.m. local MST) on ESPN. It was the 24th edition of the Famous Idaho Potato Bowl, and was one of the 2020–21 bowl games concluding the 2020 FBS football season.

Organizers announced that, due to the COVID-19 pandemic, there would be no fans in attendance at the game.

Teams
The bowl was contested by the Nevada Wolf Pack, from the Mountain West Conference, and the Tulane Green Wave, from the American Athletic Conference (The American). They accepted bids to the bowl on December 13. The teams have met once previously, in 1992, with the Green Wave winning, 34–17. This was the teams' first meeting in a bowl game.

Tulane

Tulane of The American entered the bowl with an overall record of 6–5 (3–5 in conference play). The Green Wave made their first appearance in the bowl.

Nevada

Nevada of Mountain West entered the bowl with a record of 6–2, with all games having been played in conference. The Wolf Pack had previously appeared three times in the bowl, losing each contest, most recently the January 2020 edition.

Game summary

Statistics

References

External links
 
 Game statistics at statbroadcast.com

Famous Idaho Potato Bowl
Famous Idaho Potato Bowl
Famous Idaho Potato Bowl
Famous Idaho Potato Bowl
Tulane Green Wave football bowl games
Nevada Wolf Pack football bowl games